Koo may refer to:

Kōō (1389–1390), a Japanese era
KOO, a South African food brand
Koo (social network), an Indian microblogging and social networking service
Koo Koo, a 1981 Debbie Harry album

People
Koo Chen-fu (1917–2005), Taiwanese businessman and diplomat
Koo Chung, Korean-American singer-songwriter
Koo Dae-Sung (born 1969), South Korean baseball player
Koo Hsien-jung (1866–1937), Taiwanese businessman and politician
Koo Ki-Lan (born 1977), South Korean volleyball player
Koo Kien Keat (born 1985), Malaysian badminton player 
Koo-Koo the Bird Girl, who suffered from Virchow-Seckel syndrome
Koo Stark (born 1956), American film actress and photographer
Koo Hye-sun, a South Korean actress and singer
Chung Mong Koo, South Korean business magnate
Dae-Sung Koo, Korean baseball pitcher
Duk Koo Kim, South Korean boxer
Jeffrey Koo Sr. (born 1933), Taiwanese banker
Joseph Koo, MBE, SBS, (born 1933,), Hong Kong composer
Josephine Koo (Chinese: 顧美華), Chinese actress
Jung Koo Chang (born 1963), South Korean boxer
Kaija Koo (born 1962), Finnish singer
Linda Koo (born 1954), Hong Kong epidemiologist
Louis Koo, Hong Kong actor
Koo Sze-yiu, Hong Kong activists
Nathan Koo-Boothe (born 1985), Jamaican international footballer
Ngeh Koo Ham (born 1961), Malaysian politician
Wellington Koo, Chinese diplomat
Younghoe Koo, American football player

Fictionals
Hari Koo, a protagonist in the anime series 
Doori Koo, a protagonist in the anime series

See also
Koo-Vee, a Finnish ice hockey team based at Tampere
Koo-Vee (ice hockey), a Finnish ice hockey team based at Tampere

Tai Koo (disambiguation)